Events from the year 1672 in art.

Events
March - Mural painter Antonio Verrio arrives in Britain, where he commences working on the decor of some of the country's great houses.
The Rampjaar, in which the Netherlands is invaded, results in a depression in the art market.

Paintings

Murillo – The Wedding Feast at Cana
Kanō Tanyū – 春景図 (Spring Landscape)
Willem van de Velde the Younger – Ships on a Stormy Sea
Jan Vermeer
The Guitar Player
Lady Standing at a Virginal

Publications
Gian Pietro Bellori - Le vite de’ pittori, scultori et architetti moderni (The lives of the modern painters, sculptors, and architects)

Births
October 1 - René Frémin, French sculptor (died 1744)
October 18 – Giuseppe Antonio Caccioli, Italian painter (died 1740)
date unknown
Alberto Carlieri, Italian painter (died after 1720)
Francesco Costa, Italian painter of ornaments and quadratura (died 1740)
Pietro Nelli, Italian portrait painter (died 1730)
Giovanni Battista Revello, Italian painter of landscape elements for other historical painters (died 1732)
probable – Giuseppe Laudati, Italian painter (died after 1718)

Deaths
January – Adriaen van de Velde, Dutch animal and landscape painter (born 1636)
April 1 – Francisco de Burgos Mantilla, Spanish painter (born 1612)
May 5 – Samuel Cooper, English miniature painter (born 1609)
October 8 – Abraham Lambertsz van den Tempel, Dutch Golden Age painter (born 1622)
November 4 – Lucas van Uden, Flemish Baroque painter specializing in landscapes (born 1595)
November 16 – Esaias Boursse, Dutch painter of genre works (born 1631)
December 30 – Hendrick Bloemaert, Dutch Golden Age painter (born 1601)
date unknown
Ambrosio Martínez Bustos, Spanish Baroque painter active in Granada (born 1614)
Ginevra Cantofoli, Italian painter (born 1618)
Salvi Castellucci, Italian painter active in Arezzo (born 1608)
Viviano Codazzi, Italian painter of landscapes or vedute (born 1606/1611)
Obaku Dokuryu, Japanese calligrapher and painter (born 1596)
Zhou Lianggong, Chinese bureaucrat, poet, essayist and art historian, patron of many important Chinese painters  (born 1612)
Lorenzo Tinti, Italian painter and engraver (born 1626)
Jean Varin, French sculptor and engraver (born 1604)
Abraham Willemsens, Flemish painter of history and genre paintings (born 1605/1610)

References

 
Years of the 17th century in art
1670s in art